Alain Mérieux (born 10 July 1938) is a French billionaire businessman, chairman of Institut Mérieux.

Early life
Alain Mérieux is the son of Charles Mérieux (1907–2001), and the grandson of Marcel Mérieux (1870–1937), who founded Institut Mérieux in 1897.

Career
Alain Merieux has also been involved in political activities in France, where he was first vice-president of the board of the Rhone-Alpes region from 1986 until 1998, where he was in charge of foreign relations, economic development, research and secondary education.

Personal life
Mérieux lives in Lyon, and is married with three children. In 2006, his eldest son, Christopher died of a heart attack. His middle son, Rudolph died in 1996 in a plane crash. As of 2 December 2021, Bloomberg estimated Mérieux's net worth to be US$8.80 Billion which make him the 277th richest person in the world.

See also
 Mérieux family

References 

1938 births
Living people
French billionaires
Businesspeople from Lyon
University of Lyon alumni
Harvard Business School alumni
Grand Officiers of the Légion d'honneur